Reg Benham (born February 8, 1941) is an American bobsledder. He competed in the four-man event at the 1964 Winter Olympics.

References

1941 births
Living people
American male bobsledders
Olympic bobsledders of the United States
Bobsledders at the 1964 Winter Olympics
People from Lake Placid, New York